This is a list of places with reduplication in their names, often as a result of the grammatical rules of the languages from which the names are derived.

Duplicated names from the indigenous languages of Australia, Chile and New Zealand are listed separately and excluded from this page.

Place names

 Alangalang, Leyte, Philippines
 Alang-alang, Mandaue, Philippines
 Arar, Saudi Arabia
 Baden-Baden, Germany
 Banaybanay, Davao Oriental, Philippines
 Banay-Banay, Cabuyao, Philippines
 Barbar, Bahrain
 Baubau, Indonesia
 Bela-Bela, Limpopo Province, South Africa
 Bella Bella, British Columbia, Canada
 Benabena, Papua New Guinea
 Berber, Sudan
 Bidbid, Oman
 Blup Blup, Papua New Guinea
 Bongbong, Philippines
 Bora Bora, French Polynesia
 Botbot, Pandan, Philippines
 Bud Bud, West Bengal, India
 Budge Budge, West Bengal, India
 Bulbul, Syria
 Bulo Bulo, Bolivia
 Carcar, Philippines
 Cárcar, Spain
 Cascas, Peru
 Cece, Hungary
 Chak Chak, Yazd, Iran
 Chake-Chake, Tanzania
 Dandan, Saipan, Northern Marianas Islands
 Dapdap, Philippines
 Den Den, Tunisia
 Dian Dian, Guinea
 Dum Dum, West Bengal, India
 Ee, one of the Cook Islands
 Est! Est!! Est!!! di Montefiascone, Italy, a wine region
 Fakfak, West Papua, Indonesia
 Fengfeng Mining District, Hebei, China
 Gan Gan, Argentina
 Gargar, Armenia: not an actual reduplication in Armenian, as the two ‘r’ sounds are different in this place name and are spelled using different letters.  
 Gergere, Turkey, an ancient town lying on the eastern frontier of the Cappadocia satrapy
 Gergeri, Crete, Greece, named after the Anatolian Gergere, during the 10th-century Orthodox colonization of the island
 Gilgil, Kenya
 Gode Gode, Tanzania
 Gorom-Gorom, Burkina Faso
 Guagua, Pampanga, Philippines
Gya'gya, Tibet
 Hhohho Region, Eswatini
 Holhol, Djibouti
 Hum Hum, Bangladesh
 Humayhumay, Philippines
 Ii, a municipality in Finland
 'Ili'ili, on Tutuila island, American Samoa
 Iloilo (city) and Iloilo (province), Philippines
 Irong-Irong, Iloilo Province, Philippines
 Jaghjagh River, Turkey and Syria
 Jala-jala, Rizal, Philippines
 Jiji, Nantou, Taiwan
 Kankan, Guinea
 Kapa Kapa, also known as Gabagaba, Papua New Guinea
 Karkar Island, Papua New Guinea
 Kerker, Tunisia
 Kila Kila, Papua New Guinea
 Kongkong River, South Sudan
 Külaküla, Estonia
 Kwekwe, Zimbabwe
 Lala, Lanao del Norte, Philippines
 Langa Langa Lagoon, Solomon Islands
 Layang-Layang Island, Sabah, Malaysia
 Layang-Layang, Johor, Malaysia
 Lapu-Lapu, Philippines
 Lomaloma, Fiji
 Loop Loop, Washington, United States
 Lulu City, Colorado, United States
 Musmus, Israel
 Ngorongoro, Tanzania
 Nimnim Lake, Vancouver Island, British Columbia, Canada
 Nono, Argentina
 Numa Numa, Papua New Guinea
 Onon River, Mongolia and Russia
 Pago Pago, American Samoa
 Pangpang, Philippines
 Pare-Pare, Sulawesi, Indonesia
 Paw Paw, Illinois, United States
 Paw Paw, Michigan, United States
 Paw Paw, West Virginia, United States
 Peʻepeʻe Falls, Hawaiʻi, United States 
 Piripiri, Piauí, Brazil
 Phi Phi Islands, Thailand
 Puka-Puka, French Polynesia
 Pukapuka, Cook Islands
 Qarqar, Syria
 Quemú Quemú, Argentina
 QwaQwa, former Bantustan in South Africa; the name survives as the QwaQwa campus of the University of the Free State
 Raf Raf, Tunisia
 Safsaf, Algeria
 Safsaf, Israel
 Safsaf, Libya
 Saint-Louis-du-Ha! Ha!, Quebec, Canada
 Salm-Salm, Holy Roman Empire
 Sanga-Sanga, Philippines
 Sapa-Sapa, Tawi-Tawi, Philippines
 Sa'sa', Syria
 Savusavu, Fiji
 Shanshan, Xinjiang, China, is not actually a reduplicated place name; the Chinese name consists of two characters, 鄯善, that are homophonic but distinct
 Sing Sing, New York, United States
 Sipe Sipe, Cochabamba District, Bolivia
 Sipisopiso waterfall, North Sumatra, Indonesia
 Songsong, Northern Mariana Islands, United States
 Tabontabon, Leyte, Philippines
 Tal Tal, South Africa
 Talon-Talon, Philippines
 Tan-Tan, Morocco
 Taran Taran, Pakistan
 Tartar, Azerbaijan
 Tartar, Switzerland
 Tartar Island, Antarctica
 Tata, Hungary
 Tawi-Tawi, Philippines
 Taytay, Palawan, Philippines
 Taytay, Rizal, Philippines
 Tolitoli, Central Sulawesi, Indonesia
 Tipo-Tipo, Basilan, Philippines
 Torres Torres, Spain
 Tourtour, France
 Tsili Tsili, Papua New Guinea
 Tuntum, Brazil
 Tyatya, Russia
 Walewale, Ghana
 Walla Walla, Washington, United States
 Warawara Lake (Cochabamba), Bolivia
 Wawa, Ontario, Canada
 Wawa, Pennsylvania, United States
 Wawa, Pilar, Philippines
 Wawa, Sudan
 Wawa, Togo
 Xai-Xai, Mozambique
 Xique-Xique, Brazil
 Yaya River, Russia
 Zamzam Well, Mecca, Saudi Arabia
 Zarzar Lake, Syria
 Zaza Dam, Cuba
 Zaza Reservoir, Cuba
 Zanzan, Ivory Coast
 Zorzor, Liberia

See also 
 List of reduplicated Australian place names
 List of reduplicated Chilean place names
 List of reduplicated New Zealand place names

References 

Place names
Repeated